Verseilles is a French toponym.

It may refer to:
 Verseilles-le-Bas, France
 Verseilles-le-Haut, France

See also
 Fabien Verseille
 Versailles